History for Sale is the third album by Blue October. The title of the album comes from a lyric in the song "Amazing". It was recorded at Sound Arts Studios in Houston, Texas, and at Stomp Box Studios in Arlington, Texas, and released in the United States on April 8, 2003 by Brando Records. It was co-produced by Justin Furstenfeld and David Castell.  It is the only Blue October album to feature former member Dwayne Casey on bass guitar, and the band's first album featuring lead guitarist C.B. Hudson. The track  "Come in Closer" features guest vocals by Zayra Alvarez, who later, on the CBS reality show Rock Star: Supernova, sang the song "Razorblade" on her final episode before being voted off. History for Sale was voted best album by the 2003 Houston Press Music Awards.

The album, re-released on Universal Records on August 5, 2003, is largely a response to the control the label placed on the group during the Consent to Treatment production process. The re-released version of the album includes a solo acoustic version of "Calling You" as a hidden track, while the original version of the album includes videos of the band during the recording process.

Track listing
All songs written by Justin Furstenfeld, except where noted.

Personnel
Justin Furstenfeld - lead vocals, guitar
Jeremy Furstenfeld - drums
Matt Noveskey - bass guitar on tracks 1, 3, 8, 9, 10
Dwayne Casey - bass guitar on tracks 2, 4, 5, 6, 7
C.B. Hudson - guitar
Ryan Delahoussaye - violin, mandolin
Zayra Alvarez - backing vocals
Brian Baker - engineer, editing
David Castell - flute (on "Come in Closer" and "3 Weeks She Sleeps"), programming, production, editing, synthesizer
Robert Greeson - art direction
Blue Miller - guitar, production, editing, mixing, keyboards
Mark O'Donoughue - engineer
Tim Palmer - mixing
Sam Paulos - executive producer
Derek Taylor - digital editing

References

2003 albums
Blue October albums
Universal Records albums
Albums produced by David Castell